Dejan (Cyrillic: Дејан) is a Serbian masculine given name, derived from the Slavic verb dejati, meaning "to act, to do". The name and the derived surname Dejanović are common among South Slavs.

The name is first recorded in 1325 (1333) for a voevod of king Stefan Uroš.

Notable people 
 Dejan (fl. 1346-66), Serbian magnate
 Dejan Bodiroga, Serbian basketball player
 Dejan Dabović (1944–2020), Yugoslav water polo player
 Dejan Damjanović, Montenegrin footballer
 Dejan Dimitrovski, Macedonian footballer
 Dejan Gluščević (born 1967), Serbian footballer and manager
 Dejan Iliev (born 1995), Macedonian footballer
 Dejan Janković, Serbian footballer
 Dejan Kelhar, Slovenian footballer
 Dejan Kulusevski, Swedish footballer of Macedonian descent
 Dejan Lovren, Croatian footballer
 Dejan Medaković (1922–2008), Serbian art historian, writer and academician 
 Dejan Meleg, Serbian footballer
 Dejan Savić, Serbian water polo player and coach
 Dejan Savićević, Montenegrin footballer
 Dejan Stanković, Serbian footballer and manager
 Dejan Stefanović, Serbian footballer
 Dejan Stojanović, Serbian poet, writer, essayist, philosopher, businessman and journalist
 Dejan Tomašević, Serbian basketball player
 Dejan Udovičić, Serbian water polo coach
 Dejan Đedović, Serbian futsal coach

Notes 

Slavic masculine given names
Serbian masculine given names
Bosnian masculine given names
Croatian masculine given names
Slovene masculine given names
Macedonian masculine given names